Carrickfergus was a 19th-century United Kingdom Parliament constituency, in Ireland represented, between 1801 and 1885, by one MP.

Boundaries
This constituency was the parliamentary borough of Carrickfergus in County Antrim.

Members of Parliament

Election results

Elections in the 1830s

 On petition, the election was declared void and the writ for the seat was suspended.

Elections in the 1840s

Elections in the 1850s

Elections in the 1860s

Elections in the 1870s

Elections in the 1880s

Notes and References
Notes

References

Smith, Henry Stooks (1844–50). The Parliaments of England (1st edition published in three volumes)
Craig, F. W. S., ed. (1973). The Parliaments of England (2nd edition published in one volume).  Political Reference Publications
Walker, B. M., ed. (1978). Parliamentary Election Results in Ireland, 1801-1922. Royal Irish Academy

Westminster constituencies in County Antrim (historic)
Constituencies of the Parliament of the United Kingdom established in 1801
Constituencies of the Parliament of the United Kingdom disestablished in 1885
Carrickfergus